Bogorodskoye is a rural locality (a selo) in Cheremkhovsky Selsoviet of Ivanovsky District, Amur Oblast, Russia. The population was 549 as of 2018. There are 4 streets.

Geography 
Bogorodskoye is located 21 km northwest of Ivanovka (the district's administrative centre) by road. Cheremkhovo is the nearest rural locality.

References 

Rural localities in Ivanovsky District, Amur Oblast